Brian Benoit is a former guitarist for The Dillinger Escape Plan. Before playing in Dillinger, Brian played in Jesuit with eventual Converge bassist Nate Newton. Brian joined Dillinger Escape Plan prior to recording Calculating Infinity and performed on the EP Irony Is a Dead Scene and LP Miss Machine.

In late 2004, just after the release of Miss Machine, Brian developed nerve damage in his left hand, which forced him to leave the band in 2005. He was replaced on tour by James Love and Jeff Tuttle, though Ben Weinman was the only guitar player on subsequent releases. Frontman Greg Puciato said that Brian still had a place in the band should he be able to return; he eventually did return for two of Dillinger's final three shows on December 27 and 28, 2017. 

Benoit also played reunion shows with Jesuit in 2011.

Discography
With Jesuit

 Jesuit (1999)
 Discography (2011)

With The Dillinger Escape Plan

 Calculating Infinity (1999)
 Irony Is a Dead Scene (2002)
 Miss Machine (2004)

References

Living people
Hardcore punk musicians
American heavy metal guitarists
Rhythm guitarists
Progressive metal guitarists
The Dillinger Escape Plan members
American male guitarists
21st-century American guitarists
21st-century American male musicians
Year of birth missing (living people)